Punta Patiño Airport  is an airstrip serving the Punta Patiño nature reserve in the Darién Province of Panama. The runway follows along the shoreline of the Bay of San Miguel.

Air Panama offers charter service to Punta Patiño.

See also

Transport in Panama
List of airports in Panama

References

External links
OpenStreetMap - Punta Patiño

Airports in Panama